Glenea assamana is a species of beetle in the family Cerambycidae. It was described by Stephan von Breuning in 1967.

References

assamana
Beetles described in 1967